Adela Gáborová (2 March 1940 – 12 July 2007) was a Slovak actress. She was associated with the Andrej Bagar Theatre for 44 years. Gáborová won in the category of Best Actress at the 1999 DOSKY Awards, for her performances as Lady Macbeth in the play Macbeth. She died after a long illness at the age of 67 in 2007.

Selected filmography 
When the Stars Were Red (1991)

References

External links

1940 births
2007 deaths
Slovak stage actresses
Slovak film actresses
Slovak television actresses
People from Humenné District
20th-century Slovak actresses
21st-century Slovak actresses